The 2023 Plymouth City Council election is due to be held on 4 May 2023 to elect members of Plymouth City Council in England. It will coincide with local elections across the United Kingdom.

In the previous election, both Labour and the Conservative Party gained seats as councillors who had left their party groups stood down or unsuccessfully sought re-election. The Green Party won its first ever seat on Plymouth Council in that election. Between the elections, after being deselected by the Conservative Party, the former Conservative council leader Nick Kelly started a new "Independent Alliance" group with the ex-Conservative councillor Terri Beer and the ex-Labour councillor Chaz Singh. The Independent Alliance group grew with more defections from the Conservative group.

Background

History 

Plymouth City Council held local elections, along with councils across England as part of the 2022 local elections. The council elects its councillors in thirds, with a third of seats being up for election every year for three years, with no election each fourth year to correspond with councillors' four-year terms. Councillors defending their seats in this election were previously elected in 2018. In that election, eleven Labour candidates and eight Conservative candidates were elected.

Elections in Plymouth are usually competitive between the Labour Party and the Conservative Party. The council was controlled by the Labour Party from the 2018 council election until the 2021 council election, when the council entered no overall control, with no party holding a majority of seats. One Labour councillor elected in 2018—Kevin Neil—was suspended from his party in the same year. Another councillor, Chaz Singh, left the Labour Party in 2019. Several Conservative councillors left their group to sit as independents, including the former council leader Ian Bowyer, after two of them were suspended by the group leader Nick Kelly for publishing a press release supporting a reduction in the speed limit on the A38 road through the city. Kelly was later suspended from his party after making comments about a local murder that were characterised as victim-blaming. He was later reinstated. Around the same time, other Conservative councillors left the group or were suspended. After Kelly was unable to pass a budget in February 2022, Labour called a vote of no confidence in him. Kelly lost, and the council selected a new leader, the Conservative councillor Richard Bingley, who had previously been a member of the Labour Party and the UK Independence Party. Terri Beer resigned from the Conservative group to sit as an independent councillor in response to Bingley's election.

The council remained under no overall control after the 2022 council election. Kevin Neil and several of the former Conservative councillors who had left their group didn't seek re-election; the former Conservative councillor Dave Downie unsuccessfully sought re-election as an independent candidate. The Green Party won their first ever seat on the council in Plympton Chaddlewood. Labour won Compton ward for the first time, with the winning candidate, Dylan Tippetts, becoming Plymouth's first trans councillor. The overall result saw the council remain under no overall control, with Labour and the Conservatives each on 24 seats. The independent councillor George Wheeler, who had originally been elected as a Labour candidate, joined the Green Party shortly after the election. Five independent councillors who had been suspended from or left the Conservative group rejoined it on 17 May, giving the Conservatives an overall majority on the council.

Developments since 2022

Defections and suspensions 
In October 2022, Kelly was again suspended from the Conservative group after "complaints and allegations" were made against him. He resigned from the group on 15 October, complaining that he had been deselected and accusing Bingley of a "vile, defamatory, and inaccurate outburst against me and fellow councillors". His resignation meant that the council returned to no overall control only five months after the Conservatives had held a majority of the seats. Later that month, Kelly formed an independent group on the council with the former Conservative councillor Terri Beer and the former Labour councillor Chaz Singh. The Conservative councillor Maddi Bridgeman, who had recently had complaints upheld against Bingley in an independent investigation, was suspended from the Conservative group in the same month. In December, the councillor Stephen Hulme left the Conservative group to sit as an independent councillor, saying "I don't think the council listens to the people of Plymouth". He joined Kelly's Independent Alliance group later that month. In January 2023, another Conservative councillor, Patrick Nicholson, left his party to join the Independent Alliance in protest against the proposed council budget and not being reselected as a candidate for the 2023 elections. Bridgman left the Conservative Party in January, saying that her local party had " harassed, bullied, and publicly humiliated" her because she was a woman. A report into her from the Conservative association said that her claims of sexism "amount to unbefitting conduct".

January 2023 by-elections 

Two Conservative councillors, Dan Collins and Shannon Burden, moved from Plymouth to Gloucestershire in May 2022. Labour councillors called on them to resign while Bingley said he was "confident that they are doing their job as councillors" and that he was "comfortable with the situation". In November 2022, the council passed a motion proposed by Beer calling on them to resign immediately. They resigned, saying that they had previously planned to stay until the 2023 elections. By-elections took place on 12 January 2023. Independent by-election candidates Gavin Marshall and Andrew Hill said they would join the Independent Alliance group if they were successful. The Moor View by-election was won by the Labour candidate, Will Noble, a cleaner at Derriford Hospital. The Plympton Chaddlewood by-election was won by the Green candidate, Lauren McLay, a communications specialist. Bingley blamed his party's losses on national politics, and declined to resign. The BBC journalist Ewan Murrie wrote that the Labour group would be "unlikely to call a no confidence vote before the May elections".

Council composition

References 

Plymouth City Council election
Plymouth City Council elections
2020s in Devon